The 1250 class were a class of diesel locomotive built by English Electric, Rocklea for Queensland Railways between 1959 and 1963.

History

The design of the 1250 class was unusual being a cab unit with a cab similar to the 1200 class but with a narrow long hood. They were based on a design built for use in Brazil five years prior.

The first five units had a  engine and screw couplers.

The subsequent units fitted with a  engine, auto couplers and were wired for multiple unit operation.

They were used on ore traffic on the Great Northern line, and on general freight on the North Coast and Southern lines. A characteristic addition to the 1250 class in 1961 was a sun visor to help reduce glare.

Withdrawal & disposal
Two were withdrawn in the early 1980s, donating parts to the rebuild of the single 1225 class locomotive. The remainder were withdrawn in 1987. Two units have been preserved:
1262 was retained by the Queensland Rail Heritage Division and is on static display as a cutaway at the Workshops Rail Museum, North Ipswich
1263 is owned by the Australian Railway Historical Society and stored in Townsville

Status table

References

Co-Co locomotives
Diesel locomotives of Queensland
English Electric locomotives
Queensland Rail locomotives
Railway locomotives introduced in 1959
Diesel-electric locomotives of Australia
3 ft 6 in gauge locomotives of Australia
Streamlined diesel locomotives